This article details Trailer Nos. 49 – 54 of the Manx Electric Railway on the Isle of Man.

These lightweight trailers were the purchased for the opening to Groudle Glen in 1893 but only No. 49 remains in semi-regular service today. Of note also, is number 51 which was restored to original condition in 1989 including detailing of original fleet name on the end dash panels and lightweight roof. At this time the car was numbered 13 as it would originally have been; in 1893 when it arrived there were no power cars numbered past 3, and so the trailers took consecutive numbering sequence but owing to a subsequent re-think by the operators, trailers were re-numbered commencing after the last power car (33). So it was that the original number 13 was displayed until it reverted to its latter number 51 during management and policy changes in 2001. This trailer is also serviceable but the remaining class members are in storage, with 52 serving as a flatbed wagon. Traditionally this car was stripped of its seating and roofing each winter for use by permanent way crews, but this practice ceased in 1954 after which time the item has been a dedicating flatbed runner. It survives today and had a distinctive yellow-painted dash panel with standard painted fleet number, based at Laxey Car Sheds.

References

Sources
 Manx Manx Electric Railway Fleetlist (2002) Manx Electric Railway Society
 Island Island Images: Manx Electric Railway Pages (2003) Jon Wornham
 Official Official Tourist Department Page (2009) Isle Of Man Heritage Railways

Manx Electric Railway